Jhoome Jiiya Re is a Hindi television serial that aired on Zee Next channel on the day the channel was launched on 17 December 2007. The series went off air on 4 September 2008 when it was announced that Zee Next was shutting down due to not meeting standards of the market. Jhoome Jiiya Re was shifted onto Zee TV in its afternoon slot. The show was relaunched on Zee TV channel on 8 September 2008.

Plot 
The story revolves around the life of an ordinary girl named Jia (nicknamed as Dabboo) who goes through rough times to fight for her destiny. She wants to prove herself to the society in spite of repeated failures. She loves her family and wants to make her family name a proud name to those around her. She believes that her passion for life is dance; therefore, to achieve her motives, she auditions for an academy named 'RAD'. She is selected, but not as a dancer; as a secretary. There, she befriends Apoorva.

Cast 
Preeti Amin ... Jiya Sabharwal
Lalit Parimoo ... Mahesh Sabharwal
Joyshree Arora ... Dadi
Karan Pantaki ... Apurva
Gauri Tonk ... Kiran
Riddhi Dogra ... Himani
Siddhant Karnick ... Gaurav

References

External links
Official Site on Zee TV
Official Site on Zee Next

2007 Indian television series debuts
2008 Indian television series endings
Indian television soap operas
Zee Next original programming